The 2014 NC State Wolfpack football team represented North Carolina State University in the Atlantic Division of the Atlantic Coast Conference during the 2014 NCAA Division I FBS football season. They played their home games at Carter–Finley Stadium in Raleigh, North Carolina. It was the team's second season under head coach Dave Doeren. They finished the season 8–5, 3–5 in ACC play to finish in fifth place in the Atlantic Division. They were invited to the St. Petersburg Bowl, where they defeated UCF.

Schedule

Coaching staff

Roster

Source:

Game summaries

Georgia Southern

Old Dominion

@ South Florida

Presbyterian

Florida State

@ Clemson

Boston College

@ Louisville

@ Syracuse

Georgia Tech

Wake Forest

@ North Carolina

References

NC State
NC State Wolfpack football seasons
Gasparilla Bowl champion seasons
NC State Wolfpack football